Limestone Township is a township in Montour County, Pennsylvania, United States.

Geography
According to the United States Census Bureau, the township has a total area of 13.4 square miles (34.7 km2), all of it land.

Demographics

As of the census of 2000, there were 1,004 people, 335 households, and 277 families residing in the township.

The population density was 74.9 people per square mile (28.9/km2). There were 346 housing units at an average density of 25.8/sq mi (10.0/km2).

The racial makeup of the township was 98.31% White, 0.50% African American, 0.20% from other races, and 1.00% from two or more races. Hispanic or Latino of any race were 0.30% of the population.

There were 335 households, out of which 37.0% had children under the age of eighteen living with them; 74.0% were married couples living together, 4.8% had a female householder with no husband present, and 17.3% were non-families. 14.6% of all households were made up of individuals, and 7.8% had someone living alone who was sixty-five years of age or older.

The average household size was 3.00 and the average family size was 3.34.

In the township the population was spread out, with 30.1% under the age of eighteen, 7.9% from eighteen to twenty-four, 27.2% from twenty-five to forty-four, 22.8% from forty-five to sixty-four, and 12.1% who were sixty-five years of age or older. The median age was thirty-six years.

For every one hundred females, there were 98.8 males. For every one hundred females who were aged eighteen and older, there were 98.9 males.

The median income for a household in the township was $41,369, and the median income for a family was $43,906. Males had a median income of $35,652 compared with that of $22,262 for females.

The per capita income for the township was $16,426.

Roughly 8.9% of families and 11.4% of the population were living below the poverty line, including 18.2% of those who were under the age of eighteen and 6.3% of those who were aged sixty-five or older.

References

Populated places established in 1790
Bloomsburg–Berwick metropolitan area
Townships in Montour County, Pennsylvania
Townships in Pennsylvania